Mamoona Hashmi is a Pakistani politician who served as member of the National Assembly of Pakistan.

Political career
She was elected to the National Assembly of Pakistan as a candidate of Pakistan Muslim League (N) on a seat reserved for women from Punjab in the 2002 Pakistani general election.

She was re-elected to the National Assembly of Pakistan as a candidate of Pakistan Muslim League (N) on a seat reserved for women from Punjab in the 2008 Pakistani general election. She resigned from her National Assembly seat in 2012 after joining Pakistan Tehreek-e-Insaf.

Personal life
She was born to politician and former federal minister Javed Hashmi.

References

Living people
Pakistani MNAs 2002–2007
Women members of the National Assembly of Pakistan
Pakistani MNAs 2008–2013
Pakistan Muslim League (N) MNAs
Year of birth missing (living people)
21st-century Pakistani women politicians